Bruno Roux (born 1 July 1963) is a French football manager and former professional player who played as a forward. As of the 2021–22 season, he is the head coach of Départemental 1 club US Ribécourt.

International career 
Roux was an Olympic international for France.

Personal life 
Bruno's son, Nolan, is also a professional footballer.

Honours

Player 
Le Havre

 Division 2: 1990–91

Manager 
Beauvais

 Championnat de France Amateur: 2005–06

Notes

References

External links 
 
 

1963 births
Living people
People from Noyon
Sportspeople from Oise
French footballers
Association football forwards
AS Beauvais Oise players
Paris Saint-Germain F.C. players
FC Rouen players
Le Havre AC players
Stade Rennais F.C. players
LB Châteauroux players
Red Star F.C. players
French Division 3 (1971–1993) players
Ligue 2 players
Ligue 1 players
French football managers
Association football coaches
Stade Malherbe Caen non-playing staff
AS Beauvais Oise non-playing staff
AS Beauvais Oise managers
AFC Compiègne managers
Championnat National 2 managers
Championnat National managers
Championnat National 3 managers
Footballers from Hauts-de-France